Hans Bernlöhr (18 July 1907 – 25 June 1991) was a German boxer. He competed in the men's middleweight event at the 1932 Summer Olympics.

References

1907 births
1991 deaths
German male boxers
Olympic boxers of Germany
Boxers at the 1932 Summer Olympics
Sportspeople from Stuttgart
Middleweight boxers